La Plata Fútbol Club is an Argentine football club from the city of La Plata in Buenos Aires Province. The team currently in Liga Amateur Platense, a regional league of club's city of origin.

History
The club was founded in 2000, making it one of the youngest institutions in Argentine football. In past years, La Plata played in Torneo Argentino A, the defunct tournament that was the third level of the Argentine football league system by then.

Club's stadium is Estadio Gobernador Mercante which has a capacity of 5,500, but La Plata used to play most of its home games in the much larger Estadio Ciudad de La Plata –which has a capacity of 45,000– when the team competed in tournaments organised by AFA.

La Plata FC was heavily supported by then-mayor of La Plata, Julio Alak. In 2008, three months after Alak's departure from office, it was announced that the club would disappear because of the merging to another institution, Asociación Arco Iris. although La Plata still exists nowadays.

References

External links
La Plata Fútbol Club website

La Plata FC
Association football clubs established in 2000
Sport in La Plata
2000 establishments in Argentina